The Washington Bridge is a bridge over the Harlem River in New York City.

Washington Bridge may also refer to:

 Washington Bridge (Connecticut), a drawbridge over the Housatonic River connecting Milford and Stratford, Connecticut
 Washington Bridge (Washington, Missouri), a bridge over the Missouri River at Washington, Missouri
 George Washington Bridge, a bridge over the Hudson River connecting New York City to Fort Lee, New Jersey
 George Washington Bridge Bus Station, New York City, New York
 Washington Bridge (Providence, Rhode Island), a series of three bridges over the Seekonk River connecting Providence to East Providence, Rhode Island
 Washington Crossing Bridge, a  bridge over the Delaware River connecting Titusville, New Jersey to Washington Crossing, Pennsylvania
 Washington Crossing Bridge (Pittsburgh), a bridge over the Allegheny River connecting Pittsburgh and Millvale, Pennsylvania
 George Washington Memorial Bridge or Aurora Bridge, a bridge in Seattle, Washington

See also
 Washington Avenue Bridge (disambiguation)
 George Washington Bridges (1825-1873), U.S. politician
 G. W. Bridge, a comic book character